Fransfontein is a small settlement in Kunene Region, Namibia. It is the hometown of former Deputy Prime Minister of Namibia Libertina Amathila.

History
The settlement was founded in 1891 as a Rhenish Missionary Society mission station. After the proclamations of land confiscation following the end of the Herero Wars in 1904, land there was set aside for the ǁKhauǀgoan (Swartbooi Nama).

References

Populated places in the Kunene Region